St. Stephens School is a mixed, state-run, Church of England primary school, located in Twickenham, London, England. It is affiliated with St. Stephens Church in Twickenham and regularly holds events there.

History
St Stephen's dates back to 1876 when it was constructed at Turk's Lane (now Winchester Road) and opened under government inspection. A second building was built at Chertsey Road. The original building at Turk's Lane was later condemned by the Department of Education.  In 2011, because of a lack of spaces at both Orleans Infants School and St Stephen's, Richmond Council decided  to renovate both schools, converting them to primary schools. Works were completed by 2015.

Former pupils
Sophie Ellis-Bextor

References

External links
St. Stephen's School official website
OFSTED inspectors' report (visited 2003)

See also
List of schools in Twickenham

Primary schools in the London Borough of Richmond upon Thames
Church of England primary schools in the Diocese of Southwark
Twickenham
Voluntary aided schools in London